Roos House may refer to:

in the United States
 Roos House (San Francisco, California), listed on the NRHP in San Francisco, California
Munch-Roos House, Taylors Falls, Minnesota, listed on the NRHP in Minnesota
 Roos House (Natchez, Mississippi), listed on the NRHP in Mississippi